Trevor Smith may refer to:

Sport 
Trevor Smith (cricketer) (born 1977), English cricketer
Trevor Smith (equestrian) (born 1959), Irish Olympic equestrian
Trevor Smith (field hockey) (born 1949), Australian Olympic field hockey player
Trevor Smith (fighter) (born 1981), American mixed martial artist
Trevor Smith (footballer, born 1910) (1910–1997), Charlton Athletic, Fulham, Crystal Palace and Watford footballer
Trevor Smith (footballer, born 1936) (1936–2003), Birmingham City and England footballer
Trevor Smith (footballer, born 1965), Scottish footballer 
Trevor Smith (ice hockey) (born 1985), Canadian ice hockey player

Other people
Trevor Smith (actor) (born 1970), Canadian actor and media personality
Trevor Smith (EastEnders), minor character in TV soap opera EastEnders
Trevor Tahiem Smith, Jr. or Busta Rhymes (born 1972), American rapper
Trevor Jude Smith, American ukulele player
Trevor Smith, Baron Smith of Clifton (1937–2021), British Liberal Democrat politician